Nicholas Campbell (born 24 March 1952) is a Canadian film, television and voice actor and filmmaker, who won three Gemini Awards for acting. He is known for such films as Naked Lunch, Prozac Nation, New Waterford Girl and the television series Da Vinci's Inquest.

Early life
Campbell was born in Toronto and raised in Montreal. He went to Toronto's Upper Canada College and Kingston's Queen's University where he originally studied Political Studies but later switched to English and Drama. He continued his studies in England studying five years at the London Drama Studio and at the Royal Academy of Dramatic Art (RADA). Campbell spent 40 weeks touring the country with the York Theatre Royal Repertory Company. His debut film role was in The Omen, released in 1976. After he returned from England he divided his time amongst Toronto, Los Angeles, and New York. In the 1990s he moved back to Canada.

Career
His starring film and television credits include series leads on Diamonds and The Hitchhiker. Starting his acting career in the movies he had small roles in A Bridge Too Far (1977), The Eagle Has Landed (1976) and in the Bond movie The Spy Who Loved Me (1977). Campbell was third-billed in the 1985 movie Certain Fury. Playing Billy Quinn in CBC's Major Crime (1997) he won a Gemini Award for best actor for his work. His television credits also include the role of Bobby Kennedy in Hoover vs. The Kennedys (Gemini nominee for best actor in a miniseries), Going Home (nominated for BAFTA Award), and The Valour and the Horror. Other works include The Sleep Room,  Diana Kilmury: Teamster (Gemini nomination for best supporting actor in a drama) and The Diary of Evelyn Lau. Campbell has also worked extensively with David Cronenberg, appearing in such films as Naked Lunch, The Dead Zone, Fast Company, and The Brood. Campbell has made guest appearances on TV shows including Space: 1999, Airwolf, Blue Murder, (Gemini Award for Best Performance by an Actor in a Guest Role Dramatic Series in 2001) A Nero Wolfe Mystery, Street Legal, Republic of Doyle, and Highlander: The Series.

In addition to his acting career, Campbell is also an accomplished filmmaker. He wrote and directed the 1992 documentary film Stepping Razor: Red X, which received a Genie Award nomination for Best Feature Length Documentary at the 14th Genie Awards.

Da Vinci's Inquest
Campbell's role as coroner Dominic Da Vinci in Da Vinci's Inquest brought him critical acclaim. Da Vinci's Inquest was nominated for many Gemini Awards. Of the 11 Geminis the show won, it received three for best writing in a dramatic series and three for best dramatic series. Campbell received the Gemini Award for best performance in a continuing leading dramatic role for his work on the series. Campbell also directed a number of episodes of Da Vinci’s Inquest.

In 2005, Da Vinci's Inquest ended its run. In Da Vinci's City Hall, which ran the following season, the character followed his real-life inspiration, Vancouver Mayor Larry Campbell (no relation to Nicholas), into municipal politics. No more episodes are planned, but there is talk of a series of TV films that would continue the narrative.

Filmography

Films

Television

References

External links

1952 births
Alumni of RADA
Canadian male film actors
Canadian male stage actors
Canadian male television actors
Canadian male voice actors
Living people
Male actors from Toronto
Queen's University at Kingston alumni
Upper Canada College alumni
Best Actor in a Drama Series Canadian Screen Award winners
20th-century Canadian male actors
21st-century Canadian male actors
Best Supporting Actor in a Comedy Series Canadian Screen Award winners